The women's T47 (including T45 and T46 athletes) 100 metres competition of the athletics events at the 2015 Parapan American Games was held between August 11 and 12 at the CIBC Athletics Stadium.

Records
Prior to this competition, the existing records were as follows:

T45

T46, T47

Schedule
All times are Central Standard Time (UTC-6).

Results
All times are shown in seconds.

All athletes are classified as T47 unless indicated.

Semifinals
The fastest three from each heat and next two overall fastest qualified for the final.

Semifinal 1
Wind: +1.9 m/s

Semifinal 2
Wind: +2.9 m/s

Final
Wind: +2.2 m/s

References

Athletics at the 2015 Parapan American Games